Tomi Lämsä (born September 16, 1979) is a Finnish former professional ice hockey player. He is currently the head coach of the Salavat Yulayev Ufa in the Kontinental Hockey League.

Lämsä was the head coach of the Jokerit for the 2012–13 season, remaining in that position until he was replaced by Tomek Valtonen on March 1, 2014.

References

External links

1979 births
Living people
Finnish ice hockey coaches
Finnish ice hockey forwards
Lahti Pelicans players
Sportspeople from Lahti